Rukirabasaija Kazana Ruhaga was Omukama of the Kingdom of Toro, Uganda from around 1861 to 1862. He was the second (2nd) Omukama of Toro.

Claim to the throne
He was the third son of Rukirabasaija Kaboyo Omuhundwa, Omukama of Toro between 1822 and 1865. He ascended the throne upon the death of his father in 1861.

Married life
Not much is known about the married life of Omukama Ruhaga.

Offspring
There is no record available as to who were the children of Omukama Ruhaga.

The final years
Omukama Ruhaga was murdered by his brother, Kasunga Kyebambe Nyaika, in 1866. Nyaika then seized the throne and became the Omukama.

Succession table

See also
 Omukama of Toro

References

Toro
19th-century rulers in Africa
1866 deaths
Year of birth unknown